By-elections to the European Parliament in the United Kingdom were held during the period when the United Kingdom used single-member, first-past-the-post constituencies to elect Members of the European Parliament from 1979 to 1999: they were required when a member resigned, died or was disqualified. Six by-elections were held in this period, all retained by the holding party.

The European Parliamentary Elections Act 1999 established a new system of  multi-member constituencies elected by a closed party list system based on the regions of England, plus Scotland and Wales. The single transferable vote system was retained in Northern Ireland. Corbett and McAvan were re-elected for Yorkshire and the Humber while Hudghton was re-elected for Scotland.

References

European
European Parliament elections in the United Kingdom
By-elections in the United Kingdom